Baakiyalakshmi is an Indian Tamil series on Star Vijay. This show is an official remake of Star Jalsha series Sreemoyee. It is also available on Disney+ Hotstar. It was scheduled to premiere on 16 March 2020, but due to COVID-19 lock down, it was premiered on 27 July 2020. It stars K S Suchitra Shetty in the titular role with Sathish Kumar, Reshma Pasupuleti and Ranjith in the other prominent roles.

Plot
Baakiyalakshmi "Baakiya" is a sweet, caring wife, mother, and daughter-in-law. Chezhiyan, Ezhil, and Iniya are her three children from her marriage to Gopinath "Gopi." Gopinath is having an affair with his ex-fiancée Radhika, who is raising her daughter Mayura as a single mother. Radhika befriends Baakiya, oblivious to the fact that she is Gopi's wife. Chezhiyan, Baakiya's older son, marries Jennifer "Jenny," his high school sweetheart.

Baakiya eventually sees that she is restricted to domestic life and seeks to forge her own identity. Ezhilan, Baakiya's younger son, Radhika, and Jenny assist her in starting a masala company, which Gopi and his mother, Eshwari, oppose. Iniya, Baakiya's daughter, is expelled from school. Gopi takes advantage of this situation and forces Baakiya to close her business. Baakiya, on the other hand, is able to rescind Iniya's expulsion. Baakiya resumes her business. 

Later, Ezhilan discovers that Gopi is having an affair with a lady who is Radhika. Meanwhile, Gopi and Radhika are being blackmailed by Radhika's husband, Rajesh. He incites Mayura to rebel against them. Ramamoorthy, Gopi's father, discovers Gopi's affair with Radhika and decides to expose them. However, he becomes immobilised and loses his ability to speak. Radhika's mother wishes for Gopi to marry her. Gopi and Radhika go to Baakiya's divorce hearing. Gopi finds it difficult to give her the paperwork, so he tricks her into signing them in order to get her a portion in the company he owns. Later, Gopi successfully completed the first hearing of the divorce case without the knowledge of Bakiya, who had come to court as a shareholder in Gopi's company. Radhika is excited for her new life after the first court hearing is a success At the time, Baakiya learned of Ezhil's love for a widowed Amirtha, who had a two-year-old daughter. Bakiya is on Ezhil's side. 

Radhika, who was suspicious of Gopi's actions wants to meet Gopi's family. Gopi refuses to do so. In drunk state, Gopi reveals to Radhika that Baakiya is his wife. Shocked, Radhika decides to move on while Baakiya suspects that Gopi is having an affair. Soon, Baakiya learns about Gopi and Radhika's affair. Shocked, she confronts Gopi in front of family and decides to start a new life without him. Eventually, Baakiya and Gopi get divorce. Baakiya is supported by her in-laws and children and decides not to leave the house. Infuriated, Gopi moves out of the house and manipulates Radhika against Baakiya. Thus, Radhika and Gopi get married.

Iniya decides to stay with Gopi and Radhika with a motive to separate Gopi from Radhika and to bring Gopi back home . Gopi's father Ramamoorthy also stays with Iniya in Gopi's house to protect her. Ezhil is undergoing pressure from his love, Amritha's family, while Chezhiyan and Jenny are overjoyed with the news of Jenny's pregnancy. Ezhil marries his love Amritha and brings them to the house with the support of Baakiya and Jenny. 

Gopi asks Baakiya to give 20 Lakhs to change the property to her name or else he'll sell the house where Baakiya and family are living. Baakiya challenges Gopi that she'll return the money in 6 months. She works hard for 1 week in marriage hall with Amirtha, Selvi and her team and gets a profit of 2 L which she returns to Gopi. Jenny sees a Canteen contract ad in paper and apply for that which is supposed to be Radhika's office. Despite problems created by Radhika, Baakiya bangs the contract with help of her Daughter-in-laws.

Cast

Main 
 K. S. Suchitra Shetty as Baakiyalakshmi aka Baakiya – Karpagam's daughter; Gopinath's ex-wife; Chezhiyan, Ezhilan and Iniya's mother. (2020–present)
 Sathish Kumar as Gopinath "Gopi" Ramamoorthy – Ramamoorthy and Eshwari's son; Baakiyalakshmi's ex-husband; Raadhika's ex-boyfriend turned second husband; Chezhiyan, Ezhilan and Iniya's father; Mayura's stepfather (2020–present)
 Reshma Pasupuleti as Raadhika – Baakiyalakshmi's betrayal friend; Rajesh's ex-wife; Gopinath's ex-girlfriend turned second wife; Mayura's mother. (2021–present) 
 Nanditha Jennifer (2020-2021) as Radhika (Replaced by Reshma)
Ranjith as Pazhaniswami "Palani" - Baakiyalakshmi's well-wisher (2023- present)

Recurring 
 S. T. P. Rosary as Ramamoorthy –Eshwari's husband; Gopinath's father; Chezhiyan, Ezhilan and Iniya's grandfather. (2020–present)
 Rajyalakshmi as Eshwari Ramamoorthy – Ramamoorthy's wife; Gopinath's mother; Chezhiyan, Ezhilan and Iniya's grandmother. (2020–present)
 Vikash Sampath as Chezhiyan – Baakiyalakshmi and Gopinath's elder son; Jenny's husband. (2022–present)
 Velu Lakshmanan a.k.a. Aaryan (2020-Jul.2022) as Chezhiyan (Replaced by Vikash)
 Divya Ganesh as Jennifer a.k.a. "Jenny" – Joseph and Maria's daughter; Chezhiyan's wife.  (2020–present)
 VJ Vishal as Ezhilan "Ezhil" – Baakiyalakshmi and Gopinath's younger son; Amrita's second husband. Nila's Stepfather (2020–present)
 Rithika Tamil Selvi as Amritha – Ganesh's widow; Ezhilan's wife; Nila's mother. (2020–present)
 Neha Menon as Iniya Gopinath – Baakiyalakshmi and Gopinath's daughter (2020–present)
 Baby Kritisha as Nila – Ganesh and Amritha's daughter; Ezhilan's stepdaughter (2021–present)
 Sherine Farhana as Mayura - Radhika and Rajesh daughter; Gopinath's stepdaughter (2020–present)
 Meena Sellamuthu as Selvi: The maid in Baakiyalakshmi's house also her dear friend (2020–present)
 Manmohan as Joseph David: Jenny's father (2020–present)
 Mona Kakade as Maria Joseph: Joseph's wife and Jenny's mother (2020–present)
 R. Aravindraj as Ganesh's father; Amritha's father-in-law (2021–Present)
 Revathee Shankar as Ganesh's mother; Amritha's mother-in-law (2021–Present)
 Nathan Shyam as Rajesh Kumar: Raadhika's ex-husband and Mayura's father (2020–present)
 Keerthi Vijay as Varshini – Filmmaker's daughter, Ezhil's ex-fiancee (2022–present)
 Sheela as Radhika's mother (2021–present)
 Priya as Karpagam: Baakiyalakshmi's mother (2020- present)
 Sangeetha V as Kavitha: Karpagam's daughter-in-law (2020- present)
 Sam as Rajinikanth: Physiotherapist (2022)
 Gokul Krishnan as Sathish: Ezhil's friend (2020–present)
 Pranika as Nikhila: Iniya's friend who was sexually harassed by a teacher (2021)
 Charlie Jey as Santhosh: Iniya's love interest also her senior (2020-2021)
 Hema Chinraj as Hema: Iniya's best friend (2020–2021)
 Sri Latha as Geetanjali: Iniya's school principal (2020- present)
 Parthiban as Bashkar: Selvi's husband. (2020–present)
 Geetha Narayanan as Nancy: Baakiyalakshmi's neighbor (2020–2021)
 Santhaanam Ganesan as Ezhil's best friend
 Prakash Rajan as Raveendran: Baakya took his catering order (2020) 
 Devi Teju as Annamal: Raveendran's wife (2020)
 Madhan as Ganesh: Amritha's ex-husband who dies in an accident
 Sumangali as Amritha's mother
 Kausalya Senthamarai as Judge 
 Pandiarajan as Sundaram: Ramamoorthy's younger brother. (2020-2021)

Guest appearances

Casting 
Kannada TV actress Suchitra was cast as the main heroine, Baakiyalakshmi. Actor Sathish played Gopinath's character. Nandita Jennifer initially played the role of Radhika but she left the serial in July 2021 as she was unhappy with her character transitioning into a villain. As a result, she was replaced by Reshma Pasupuleti.

References

External links 
 
 Baakiyalakshmi at Hotstar

Star Vijay original programming
Tamil-language melodrama television series
2020 Tamil-language television series debuts
Tamil-language television series based on Bengali-languages television series
Tamil-language television soap operas
Television shows set in Tamil Nadu
Tamil-language television shows